Pectinate may refer to:

 Pectinate line, a line which divides the upper two thirds and lower third of the anal canal
 Pectinate muscles, parallel ridges in the walls of the atria of the heart
 A salt of the heteropolysaccharide pectin